Terrorism: Opposing Viewpoints is a book, in the Opposing Viewpoints series, presenting selections of contrasting viewpoints on four central questions about terrorism: whether it is a serious threat; what motivates it; whether it can be justified; and how the United States should respond to it.  It was edited by Laura K. Egendorf.

It was published by Greenhaven Press (San Diego) in 2000 as a 203-page hardcover and paperback.

Contents

External links
Terrorism at BookRags.com.

2000 non-fiction books
Books about terrorism
Books in the Opposing Viewpoints series
Greenhaven Press books